Sasha Lazard is an American classical crossover singer.

Lazard was born in New York City and grew up in Paris. She attended Bennington College and the San Francisco Conservatory of Music, studying opera, but after graduation pursued a more electronic-influenced sound inspired by the local nightclub scene. She performed her new music at several clubs in New York, Los Angeles, and Ibiza before recording an album.

Lazard released her debut album The Myth Of Red, was produced by Frank Fitzpatrick, through Higher Octave Music. This album, loosely themed around the myth of Inanna descending to the underworld, appeared on the Billboard charts for both dance music and classical crossover. It features versions of Ave Maria entitled Ode to Innocence, and Giovanni Battista Pergolesi's Stabat Mater. It also features a track entitled Tell My Why, featuring violinist Lili Haydn that was inspired by Giuseppe Verdi's La Traviata. The lyrics from The Incubus, (Le Revenant) are written by Charles Pierre Baudelaire. The song Angeli was inspired by Antonio Cesti's Intorno All Idol Mio and has been featured in the Fall 2006 Victoria's Secret campaign, the movie Kissed by an Angel, the movie Modigliani starring Andy García, and was used as the theme song for the Toronto International Film Festival.

Lazard teamed up with soprano Shawna Stone and Grammy award-winning producer Peter Asher and producer Frank Fitzpatrick to sing original songs, opera favorites (Una furtiva lagrima), classical favorites Panis angelicus and Stabat Mater (from "The Myth of Red") and 

contemporary covers from Radiohead ("Street Spirit (Fade Out)") to James Taylor ("Close Your Eyes") to Kansas ("Dust in the Wind") to Sting ("Fields of Gold"). The album, titled Siren, was released on March 6, 2007, on Manhattan Records/EMI.

In 2005 she released her second album Moonfall, more acoustic in style than its predecessor. In 2015, Lazard released her fifth studio album.

In 2018, Lazard produced the soundtrack for the feature film "Blind" with Dave Eggar, Amy Lee and Chuck Palmer.

Personal life 
In May 2004, she married film producer Michael Mailer.

Filmography 

Princess Mononoke,
Holy Smoke!,
Cowboys & Angels,
Modigliani, 
Kettle of Fish 
The Lodger.

References

External links
Official site

American women singers
Singers from New York City
Opera crossover singers
Bennington College alumni
Year of birth missing (living people)
Living people
21st-century American women